Nightmares is the first EP by American heavy metal band Omen. It was originally released in 1987 by Metal Blade. It was later included as bonus tracks on the 1989 re-issue of Warning of Danger and the 1996 re-issue of The Curse.

Track listing

Personnel
Omen
 J.D. Kimball - vocals
 Kenny Powell - guitars
 Steve Wittig - drums
 Jody Henry - bass

Production
 Omen - production
 Bill Metoyer - engineering
 Brian Slagel - executive production
 Eddy Schreyer - mastering
 Gerald McLaughlin - cover art
 Kevin Winter - photography

References

Omen (band) albums
1987 EPs
Metal Blade Records EPs